Wheble is a surname. Notable people with the surname include:

John Wheble (1746–1820), British printer, author, and antiquary
Mick Wheble (born 1949), British racing manager, marketing executive, author, and charity advocate